The Pan-African Media Alliance for Climate Change (PAMACC) is one of Africa’s associations of environment journalists. It was created in June 2013 at a workshop the Pan African Climate Justice Alliance organised for African journalists.

PAMACC's aim is to support journalists to improve their reporting on climate change and has set up a website to share their stories.

It has regional coordinators, who will encourage journalists to set up national bodies in each country. The coordinator for Southern Africa, Sellina Nkowani from Malawi, has also stated that she wants the alliance to encourage more women journalists to report on climate change.
The other regional coordinators are Elias Ngalame from Cameroon (for Central Africa), Atayi Babs Opaluwah from Nigeria (for West Africa) and Kizito Makoye from Tanzania (for East Africa). Isaiah Esipisu from Kenya will act as the continent-wide coordinator.

References 

International climate change organizations
Environmental organizations based in Africa